John Furniss is a British costume designer. He was nominated at the 47th Academy Awards for Best Costumes for the film Daisy Miller.

Filmography

International Velvet (1978)
Wombling Free (1977)
Escape from the Dark (1976)
Paper Tiger (1975)
Daisy Miller (1974) (as John Furness)
Undercovers Hero (1974)
A Doll's House (1973)
England Made Me (1973)
Endless Night (1972)
Sleuth (1972)
Cry of the Penguins (1971)
The Go-Between (1970)
The Kremlin Letter (1970)
Those Daring Young Men in Their Jaunty Jalopies (1969)
The Valley of Gwangi (1969)
The Long Duel (1967)
The Viking Queen (1967)
The Blue Max (1966)
Eye of the Devil (1966) (as John Furness)

References

External links

1935 births
British costume designers
Living people
Designers from London